Dale Sanders (born 1957) is a prolific railroad photographer and the former editor of CTC Board, a magazine for fans of railroading showcasing high-quality photography and up-to-date news of North American railroading. The magazine frequently featured Sanders' work.

Dale graduated from Oroville High School, in Oroville, California in 1975.  He then attended California State University, Chico, where he graduated with a bachelor's degree in Visual Communication (photography, graphic design, and printing technology).

During his college years Dale took over the editorship of a small newsletter about railroading in the western United States. During his tenure, CTC Board became a magazine with worldwide circulation. In 1995 the magazine was sold to Hundman Publishing of Edmonds, Washington. It was sold again to White River Productions in 2006. It is still in publication under the title Railroads Illustrated.

Sanders extensively photographed the Western Pacific Railroad in California's Feather River Canyon, the Denver & Rio Grande Western throughout Colorado and Utah, U.S. Steel's Atlantic City Mine Railroad and most recently BC Rail in western Canada.

He now resides in northwestern Washington state writing/editing railroad-related books.

Sanders received the WinteRail Hall of Fame Award in 2014.

References
 Sanders, Dale. Northern Light: A Portrait of BC Rail. Kansas City, MO: White River Productions, 2009. Northern Light is an all-color portrait of one of North America's most fascinating railways — BC Rail. With 303 full color photographs and 12 illustrated maps, this volume presents a retrospective of the entire BC Rail system during its 20-year life span between June 1984 and July 2004. In the pages of Northern Light may be found all the elements that made BC Rail so interesting. From its locomotives (including steam, diesel, and electric) to its unique Budd RDC passenger operations, BC Rail was a railway like no other. Besides just machinery, BC Rail's right-of-way passed through some of the most beautiful and diverse scenery in North America. Perhaps the railway's most valuable feature were the railroaders who performed their assigned duties with professionalism and a passion for railroading. The photographs of the machines, landscapes, and people included in Northern Light tell the whole story of British Columbia's own railway. From the familiar to rare images of remote trackage never before photographed, it's all here in one amazing volume.
 Sanders, Dale & Hyde, Frederick. The Milwaukee Road Diesel Power. Antioch, IL: The Milwaukee Road Historical Association, 2009. This book covers the entire history of The Milwaukee Road's eclectic diesel roster from the humble beginnings of the diesel era through the sale of the road to Soo Line. Detailed coverage is provided on each model in the Milwaukee's locomotive fleet (including its home-built Bulldog motor cars and industrial switchers). The multitude of paint schemes that adorned the fleet is also examined as is the road's complex locomotive renumbering and retirement information.
 Sanders, Dale. The Northern Pacific. Mukilteo, WA: Hundman Publishing, 1999. This book features an all-color tour of the entire Northern Pacific Railway system, from the Great Lakes to the Pacific Northwest. Steam, black-and-gold freight diesels, to the line's passenger flagship, the two-tone green North Coast Limited, including its vaunted vista-dome cars, are all shown in detail.
 Sanders, Dale. Rio Grande: Scenic Line of the World. Denver, CO: Hyrail Productions, 1996. Coverage of the Denver & Rio Grande Western in the Rocky Mountains.

American photographers
California State University, Chico alumni
Living people
1957 births